Jean-Louis Debré (born 30 September 1944) is a former French judge and politician who served as President of the National Assembly from 2002 to 2007 and President of the Constitutional Council from 2007 to 2016. He was Minister of the Interior from 1995 until 1997 during the presidency of Jacques Chirac. Since 2016 he has been President of the Superior Council of Archives.

Early life and family
Debré was born in Toulouse. He is the son of former Prime Minister Michel Debré, grandson of medicine professor Robert Debré, and brother of politician Bernard Debré.

Political career
Debré was a member of the Neo-Gaullist party Rally for the Republic (RPR), then of the Union for a Popular Movement (UMP).

Debré was first elected to the National Assembly in the 1986 parliamentary election; he was re-elected in 1988, 1993, 1997, and 2002 as a deputy from Eure's 1st constituency. He served as Minister of the Interior in Prime Minister Alain Juppé's governments (1995–1997). As minister, he was criticized for having allowed the armed Corsican clandestine press conference, and was responsible for the controversial 1996 evacuation of Saint-Bernard de la Chapelle church in Paris, which was occupied by illegal immigrants (so called sans-papiers) on hunger strikes. Also during his time in office, he led efforts on a 1997 law aimed at curbing illegal immigration and making it easier to assimilate foreigners in the country.

On the local level, Debré was elected as Mayor of Évreux in 2001, serving in that post until 2007.

Debré later served as leader of the RPR group in the National Assembly from 1997 to 2002 and then President of the National Assembly from 2002 to 2007. Faithful to President Chirac, he frequently criticized UMP leader Nicolas Sarkozy. He resigned as President of the National Assembly three months before the end of his tenure.

President of the Constitutional Council
On 22 February 2007, Debré was appointed by Chirac as President of the Constitutional Council. He replaced Pierre Mazeaud in the latter position, and was replaced by Laurent Fabius in 2016.

During his time as president, the Constitutional Council notably ruled in 2011 that France’s ban on same sex marriage did not violate the constitution and the decision on whether to legalize it rested with parliament.

In 2015, a chance encounter between Debré and homeless author Jean-Marie Roughol led the latter to write about living rough, resulting in the French bestseller Je tape la manche (I’m begging).

Later career
In 2020, Prime Minister Jean Castex commissioned Debré with a report on options to facilitate voting during the public health crisis caused by the COVID-19 pandemic in France, including a reversal of the ban on mail-in voting.

Political positions
In 2005, The Guardian described Debré as "perhaps the most dedicated of all defenders of the Chirac faith." He later voted for François Hollande in the 2012 French presidential election. In the Republicans' 2016 presidential primaries, he publicly endorsed Alain Juppé as the party's candidate for the 2017 elections.

Overview
Governmental function

Minister of Interior : 1995–1997.

Electoral mandates

National Assembly of France

President of the National Assembly of France : 2002–2007 (Resignation, became President of the Constitutional Council of France in 2007).

President of the Rally for the Republic Group in the National Assembly : 1997–2002. Elected in 1997.

Member of the National Assembly of France for Eure's 1st constituency : 1986–1995 (Became minister in 1995) / 1997–2007 (Resignation became President of the Constitutional Council of France in 2007). Elected in 1986, reelected in 1988, 1993, 1997, 2002.

General Council

Vice-president of the General Council of Eure : 1998–2001 (Resignation).

General councillor of Eure : 1992–2001 (Resignation). Reelected in 1998.

Municipal Council

Mayor of Évreux : 2001–2007 (Resignation).

Municipal councillor of Évreux : 1989–1995 / 2001–2007 (Resignation).

Deputy-mayor of Paris : 1995–1997 (Resignation).

Councillor of Paris : 1995–1997 (Resignation).

Agglomeration community Council

President of the Agglomeration community of Évreux : 2001–2007. (Resignation).

Member of the Agglomeration community of Évreux : 2001–2007. (Resignation).

Political functions

Spokesman of the Rally for the Republic : 1993–1995.

Bibliography
 Le Pouvoir Politique (co-author, 1976)
 Le Gaullisme (co-author, 1977)
 La Justice au XIXe Siècle, les Magistrats (1980)
 Les Républiques des Avocats (1984)
 Le Curieux (1986)
 En mon for intérieur (1997)
 Pièges (1998)
 Le Gaullisme n'est pas une Nostalgie (1999)
 Quand les Brochets font Courir les Carpes (2008)
 Les oubliés de la République (2008)
 Ce que je ne pouvais pas dire (2016)
 Tu le raconteras plus tard'' (2017)

See also
Debré family

References

|-

|-

1944 births
Living people
Politicians from Toulouse
French twins
Presidents of the National Assembly (France)
Politicians of the French Fifth Republic
French interior ministers
French people of Jewish descent
The Republicans (France) politicians
Union for a Popular Movement politicians
Sciences Po alumni
Deputies of the 12th National Assembly of the French Fifth Republic